"Kowalski" is a song by Scottish rock band Primal Scream, released on 5 May 1997 as the lead single from their fifth studio album Vanishing Point. The song contains a drum sample from "Halleluhwah" by Can and an interpolation of the bassline from "Get Off Your Ass and Jam" by Funkadelic, and is named after the main character of the 1971 film Vanishing Point, played by Barry Newman; it also features various dialogue samples from said film.

The song peaked at number eight on the UK Singles Chart and became the band's highest-charting single in Scotland, reaching number two. In Australia, the song was a minor hit on the ARIA Singles Chart, peaking at number 79.

Music video
Scripted by Irvine Welsh and directed by Steven Hanft, the video features Kate Moss and Devon Aoki stealing a Dodge Challenger before then tracking down and assaulting the band. The band's lead singer, Bobby Gillespie, described the video as "a cross between Faster Pussycat, Kill! Kill! and The Sweeney."

Track listings

Charts

References

1997 singles
1997 songs
Creation Records singles
Primal Scream songs
Song recordings produced by Brendan Lynch (music producer)
Songs written by Andrew Innes
Songs written by Bobby Gillespie
Songs written by Mani (musician)
Songs written by Martin Duffy (musician)
Songs written by Robert Young (musician)